Dafydd Morgan "Dai" Henwood (born 7 February 1978) is a New Zealand comedian. He is best known for his hosting of several television shows found on Three but also performs stand-up comedy.

Life and career
Henwood was born in 1978 to father Ray and mother Judge Carolyn Henwood. Henwood has stated his great-grandfather was Welsh international rugby player, Dick Jones. Henwood studied Theatre and Film at Victoria University of Wellington, graduating with a BA in eastern religions, before winning 'Best New Face' on TV2's Pulp Comedy in 1999, the Billy T Award in 2002 and the Fred Award in 2007.

In 2004 and 2005, Henwood toured the shows The Hot Stepper and Champagne Table Tennis, and performed at the Tokyo Comedy Store and in Melbourne and around Britain. He has subsequently performed seasons in both Auckland and Wellington during the New Zealand International Comedy Festival including "Dai-Namic Scenarios" (2007 & 2008), "Shabba" (2009), "Dai Another Day" (2009), "Ideals vs. Reality" (2010), "Fonzie Touched Me" (2011) and "Adapt Or Dai" (2013). In 2008 he was invited to the Montreal Just For Laughs Festival and recorded for a televised Gala special.

Henwood spent a period on TV3's Sunrise morning show, as the gadget guy, giving humorous reviews of the latest gadgets. He subsequently rose to prominence after featuring on television station C4 hosting "Insert Video Here", then went on to host two series of a comedy travel show Roll The Dai on the same network.

Since August 2009 Henwood has been captain of "Team Two" on TV3's weekly panel comedy show 7 Days, filming over 150 episodes in that time.

Henwood has recorded two DVDs titled Dai Another Day, released by EMI in late 2009 and "Adapt or Dai" released by Universal Music in 2013.

In 2016 he was presented with the Rielly Comedy Award from the Variety Artists Club of New Zealand.

In January 2023, in an interview on The Project, Henwood shared publicly that he was diagnosed with metastatic bowel cancer in 2020.

Filmography

Film

Television

Awards and nominations

See also
 List of New Zealand television personalities

References

External links
 

1978 births
Living people
New Zealand male comedians
New Zealand television presenters
Victoria University of Wellington alumni
People from Wellington City